Süleyman of Germiyan (died in 1388), also known as Şah Çelebi, was the ruler of Germiyan, an Anatolian beylik, between 1363 and 1388. (Anatolia is the Asiatic part of Turkey)

Accession
He ascended to throne upon the death of his father Mehmet of Germiyan.

Reign
To the south of Germiyan territory, two other beyliks were fighting and Süleyman supported İlyas, a bey of Hamidoğlu, against the powerful Alaattin Ali of Karaman Beylik. Although İlyas was able to regain his former possessions from the Karaman beylik, this support caused hostility between the Germiyan and Karaman beyliks. Süleyman asked for Ottoman support against Karaman threat and consequently his daughter Devletşah Hatun married to Ottoman şehzade (prince) Bayezid (later Bayezid I) in 1378. But this support was a very costly one, because Ottomans acquired the most prosperous part of the Germiyan beylik as a dowry. Even Germiyan capital Kütahya was a part of the dowry.

Death and aftermath
Süleyman had to recede to Kula and died in 1388. He was laid to rest in a tomb named Süleyman Bey türbesi in Kula  He was succeeded by Yakup II of Germiyan.

Family

Marriages
He married two times:
A daughter of Umur of Aydın
Mutahhare Abide Hatun, daughter of Sultan Walad, son of Rumi

Progeny
Yakup II Bey - son with daughter of Umur of Aydın;
Hızır Pasha - son with Mutahhare Abide Hatun;
Ilyas Pasha - son with Mutahhare Abide Hatun;
Sultan Hatun - daughter with Mutahhare Abide Hatun, married to Bayezid I;

References

Turkic rulers
1388 deaths
People from Kütahya
History of Kütahya Province
Germiyan
Year of birth unknown
14th-century monarchs in Asia